Dangal 2 is an Indian Hindi entertainment channel that was owned by Enterr10 Television Network. This channel shows repeated programmes from Hindi Entertainment Channel Dangal  and acquired shows from old Hindi Entertainment Channel Imagine TV. It is a free to air channel. It was launched on 2 April 2022.

Current shows

Former shows

References

External links 
 Official facebook page of Dangal 2

Hindi-language television channels in India
Television channels and stations established in 2022
Hindi-language television stations
Television stations in New Delhi